John Campbell (born 2 September 1942) is an Australian rower. He competed in the men's coxed four event at the 1964 Summer Olympics.

Club and state rowing
Campbell's senior rowing was from the Sydney Rowing Club.

At the 1964 Australian Rowing Championships Campbell contested both the coxless and coxed four championship and in a Sydney crew won the coxed four title and with it, selection for the Tokyo Olympics.

Campbell's sole state representative appearance came in 1964 when he was picked at five in the New South Wales senior eight which contested the King's Cup at the Interstate Championships held in Sydney.

International representative rowing
At the 1964 Tokyo Olympics Campbell represented Australia in the three seat of an all Sydney Rowing Club men's coxed four. They placed tenth.

References

1942 births
Living people
Australian male rowers
Olympic rowers of Australia
Rowers at the 1964 Summer Olympics
Place of birth missing (living people)
20th-century Australian people